The Pilatus P-2 is a trainer aircraft designed by Swiss manufacturer Pilatus in 1942 and first flown on April 27, 1945. It was used by the Swiss Air Force from 1946 until 1981. The Pilatus P-2 emerged from an unbuilt project of the Pilatus P-1, which can be seen as a single-seat version of the P-2.

Design and development

The P-2 is a low-wing monoplane of mixed construction (metal, wood and fabric) with a fully retractable tailwheel undercarriage and dual control tandem seating.  To save cost, several parts came from older Swiss AF machines, for example landing gear parts from their Messerschmitt Bf 109s.  There were two series of production machines, one (P-2-05) unarmed and the second (P-2-06) equipped as weapons trainers, with a machine gun above the engine and wing racks for light bombs and rockets.

After the end of their Swiss Air Force service, the survivors (numbering about 48) were sold into civilian service. In 2008 at least 23 appeared on the national registers of Switzerland, Germany, France, the United Kingdom and the United States. They proved to be a popular civil flyer's aeroplane and have often appeared in Luftwaffe garb in films and airshows as an unidentified "enemy" aircraft.

Variants

P-2-01
First prototype (HB-GAB/A-101/U-101), Argus-powered.

P-2-02
Non-flying static testframe.

P-2-03
Hispano-Suiza HS-12Mb upright V water-cooled engined prototype.  Large ventral radiator.

P-2-04

Armed version of P-2-03.

P-2-05
Production version of unarmed machine, Argus motor.  26 delivered to Swiss AF.

P-2-06
Production version of armed machine, Argus motor.  26 delivered to Swiss AF.

Operators

Haitian Air Force

Swiss Air Force

Specifications (P-2)

See also

References

Further reading

P-02
1940s Swiss military trainer aircraft
Single-engined tractor aircraft
Low-wing aircraft
Aircraft first flown in 1945